The North American Christian Convention (1927–2018) was an annual summer convention supported by churches, colleges, institutions, and missions programs associated with the Christian churches and churches of Christ, mainly across the United States, but also in other parts of the world. First started in 1927, it grew gradually over the years in both attendance and location. The NACC was held annually after 1927 until the end of that decade; the deprivations brought about by the Great Depression and the dislocations caused by World War II contributed to its being held only three times in the 1930s and four times in the 1940s; it was an annual event from 1950 to 2018. Ministers from churches across the United States came and spoke at the event, as well as other well-known speakers and authors of the Christian community. The NACC Mission statement was "the connecting place providing ideas, inspiration, and identity to New Testament Christian Churches and their leaders." Philosophically this organization gives all their credit to Jesus Christ. It was replaced in 2019 by the spire.network conference.

Events

Adults
Adults were able to participate in three main events: the main session, bible studies, and workshops. The main session was a time of praise and worship, sermons from guest speakers, testimonies, and a time to get to know other people. The bible studies allowed adults to get together with small groups and fellowship one on one. The workshops also allowed adults to choose from various classes in which to learn and grow.

Teens
Teens were involved in the same events as adults but on a level where they could have fun and grow spiritually at the same time. They had a main session with worship from high energy, world-renowned bands, guest speakers, talk sessions, and entertainment from comedians and performance groups.

Children and Toddlers
The NACC also had programs for young children. A day camp allowed children to have fun in groups with others their age. Each small group or camp unit was led by an adult leader who provided games and a learning environment. Daycare (Wee-One-Wigwam) was available for young toddlers and babies.

Bible Bowl
First introduced to NACC at the Tulsa, Oklahoma Convention in 1965, the Bible Bowl drew teens and kids in grades 6–12 every year to compete in scripture memorization and other bible events. It also allowed teens and kids to fellowship with each other and grow through bible studies, guest speakers, and prayer groups. In 2001, Bible Bowl became independent from the NACC and started its own national program as it grew, with separate competitions and events.

Minister and Spouse
This event focused on bringing spouses closer to each other and with God. It was a time where a husband and wife could get away to relax, laugh, smile and enjoy a few days of peace. Guest speakers and talented artists allowed for fellowship and fun while events such as hiking, golfing and shopping let husband and wife enjoy their time away.

Leadership
The NACC Board of Stewards, Committees, and Staff members all ensured adherence to the NACC Mission and supported the NACC through prayer, attendance and commitment to personal financial support.

Staff
The NACC main office was in Cincinnati, Ohio. The Staff were about 7 to 10 members who acted as project managers. They included:
Managing Director – handled day-to-day operations, finalized contracts, and managed the facility plans
Business Administrator & Church Relations – handled the financial matters
Special Events & Workshops Coordinator – planned & set up the ticketed & non-ticketed meals & receptions, as well as the workshops
Children's Convention and Marketing/Promotions Coordinator – coordinated the children's planning committee and the publicity & marketing materials
Information Technology Coordinator
Registration and Office Services Coordinator – managed registration and customer service on-site, and many other things
Executive Administration and Program/Production Manager – worked with all the leadership committees and implement the main programming.
There were a few supporting cast members outside the office, like the person who coordinated the Student Convention, and the partner that handled the registration and hotel reservation data entry.

Board of Stewards
The Board of Stewards consisted of ten members who are the past President, current President, President-Elect, on average 6 members and the current NACC Executive Director. The ten of them come together and have these duties to accomplish. First, they Set and review corporate policies. Second, they worked to provide review and accountability to the Executive Director and the NACC Staff. Ensure fiscal satiability, including but not limited to, setting budgets and raising funds. Approve the venue and cities for NACC events. Then lastly they focus on long-range and strategic issues.

Continuation Committee
The Continuation Committee consisted of on average 120 members including all eligible past Presidents who represent the Christian churches and churches of Christ across the United States and Canada. They are a group who served as a support system and gave advice to the executive committee and the Board of Stewards. They served a three-year term in this position. These members are from all over the country, they came together every October before the next summer convention and met in the city that it was going to be held at. During the October planning meeting they assisted the executive committee plan for the future NACCs by providing guidance on potential speakers, workshop topics, and workshop leaders.

Executive committee
The Executive Committees were made up of thirteen members including the President, Vice President, Secretary/Treasurer, on average 6 members two local arrangement committee Co-Chairs, National prayer chair, and the NACC Managing Director. The main role the executive committee was to  plan and put in order all the NACC programs for their appointed year.

Presidency
The President, Vice President, and Secretary/Treasurer were chosen three years before their convention summer. The current President formed a Nomination Committee in the spring before the new president was elected. After the possible candidates were nominated, the committee prayerfully chose who would fill the new presidential board. The President provided leadership and approved all recommendations for the NACC event. He served as the primary NACC representative to the constituency through travel, writing and speaking engagements.

Conventions

Volunteers
The President, Vice President, Committee members, and Board members (who had a great part in planning this event) were all volunteers. The Tech teams, teachers of the different workshops, people who watch the kids during the sessions and behind the scenes people are all volunteers. Most of them dedicated one week every summer to attend this event and were volunteers at it. Without the help of volunteers this event would not have been as large and effective as it was.

Location
In 1927 the NACC had its first annual summer event in Indianapolis, Indiana. Since then it was held in 20 other cities across the United States. It was usually held in the Midwest as approximately 85% of the New Testament Churches are in Ohio, Indiana, Kentucky, Illinois, and Missouri. The average attendance was 8,000–12,000 for an average of three and a half nights. When the location was moved outside of the Midwest, attendance dropped as much as 50%.

Support and partnership
Churches and Christian organizations from all across the United States funded the NACC. The supporting churches helped the NACC reach out to people all over the world who come to the event. Donations ranged from $200 a year to more than $30,000 a year. Supporting churches included Discover Christian Church in Dublin, Ohio and Savannah Christian Church in Savannah, Georgia. The NACC also partnered with many Christian colleges such as Atlanta Christian College and Cincinnati Christian University, and other organizations like Good News Production International and CMF International. The NACC raised money and support for the program by holding an exhibition every year.

Exhibition
The exhibition allowed for hundreds of organizations such as churches, radio stations, colleges and other Christian organization to set up booths during the event and share what their school or program had to offer.

References

External links
 
 Bible Bowl

Christian organizations established in 1927
Christian churches and churches of Christ
Restoration Movement
Christian denominations established in the 20th century
1927 establishments in North America
2018 disestablishments in the United States